"Ständchen" ("Serenade") is an art song composed by Richard Strauss in 1886, setting a poem of the same title by the German poet Adolf Friedrich von Schack. It is the second song in his collection Six songs for high voice and piano, Op. 17, TrV 149, which were all settings of Schack poems. The song is written for voice and piano.

Composition history

Schack was a wealthy aristocrat who was a poet, linguist, diplomat and art collector. He was born in Mecklenburg but lived in Munich from 1855 onwards. His translations of Persian poems were among his outstanding contributions.  Strauss set ten poems by Schack, the six in the Opus 17 collection, following on from four in his earlier Opus 15 songs (which included Winternacht).

In 1972 Norman Del Mar wrote:  With "Ständchen" we come face to face with the most popular of all Strauss' songs. So often has it been heard in its orchestral form that it is easy to forget that the instrumentation is not by Strauss at all, but Felix Mottl. Other arrangements for piano solo and duett, salon orchestra etc quickly followed, and the song could well claim to have made Strauss's name into a household word single handed.  That it is a masterpiece there can be little doubt.  

The song's featherweight accompaniment combined with a light and beautifully shaped melody sets the song apart, and "the surges of lyricism both in the refrain and the climax...are the essence of that glowing ecstasy which is the peculiar quality of Strauss' art at its best".  Whilst in more recent years the song's popularity has been overtaken by others, notably "Morgen!" and the Four Last Songs, the song remains a standard part of recorded collections of Strauss songs.

The first public concert performance was with Strauss accompanying the tenor Heinrich Zeller at Weimar on 28 October 1889. He wrote to his parents that the song was repeated by popular demand. Strauss recorded the piece twice: in 1941 conducting the orchestral version with the tenor Julius Patzak and the Bavarian State Orchestra and in 1942 for a radio broadcast from Vienna on the piano with Finnish soprano Lea Piltti.

The poem "Ständchen" has also been set by several other composers, including a version by Pfitzner.

Lyrics
Schack's poem comes from his 1866 collection Liebesgedichte und Lieder (Love Poems and Songs). Strauss slightly altered the words to the second verse (the original second line has "die über die Blumen hüpfen").

The 1912 Paul England translation is a "singable translation" which is compatible with the vocal line Strauss wrote for the German.

Music 
The music follows the text from a soft beginning with shimmering piano accompaniment to the ecstatic climax on "hoch glühn", when the rose is expected to glow from the "night's rapture". Roger Vignoles, the pianist for a recording of the complete songs by Strauss sung by tenor Andrew Kennedy, wrote in the liner notes about the complexity of rhythm in the treatment of longer syllables in the text, and in the climax which "thrillingly mixes short and long phrases, quick and slow, in the interplay between voice and piano".

Orchestral version

In 1895 the Austrian conductor Felix Mottl (1856–1911) wrote an orchestral version of the song, which was not finally published until 1912. The instrumentation consists of:

 Three flutes, two oboes, two clarinets, two bassoons
 Four french horns, one trumpet, three trombones
 Timpani
 Two harps
 Strings

Strauss himself conducted the Mottl orchestral version, and indeed recorded it in 1941.

References
Notes

Sources

Del Mar, Norman, Richard Strauss. A Critical Commentary on his Life and Works, Volume 3, London: Faber and Faber (2009)[1968] (second edition), .
Getz, Christine (1991), The Lieder of Richard Strauss, chapter 10 in Mark-Daniel Schmid, Richard Strauss Companion, Praeger Publishers, Westfield CT, 2003, .
Jefferson, Alan. (1971) The Lieder of Richard Straus, Cassel and Company, London.  
Schuh, W. Richard Strauss: A Chronicle of the Early Years 1864–1898, (translated by Mary Wittal), Cambridge University Press, 1982. .
Trenner, Franz (2003) Richard Strauss Chronik, Verlag Dr Richard Strauss Gmbh, Wien, .

External links 
 
 Lieder.net text and translations
 Ständchen (Serenata), op. 17 n. 2 flaminioonline.it
 Albert Combrink on Ständchen

Songs by Richard Strauss
1886 songs